LAVIS  is a software tool created by the TOOL Corporation, Japan.  LAVIS is a "layout visualisation platform".  It supports a variety of formats such as GDSII, OASIS and LEF/DEF   and can be used as a platform for common IC processes.

References

External links 
 TOOL Corporation

Computer-aided design
Electronic engineering